The FIA European Cup for Cross-Country Bajas is a rally raid series organised by the FIA, culminating with a champion driver, co-driver, and team; with additional trophies awarded to T3 and T4 drivers & teams.

The series runs concurrent with the FIA World Cup for Cross-Country Bajas and FIM Bajas World Cup; alongside the World Rally-Raid Championship. Started in 2021; the series was designed to attract new entrants to rally raid and allow them to run for an official FIA title.

Champions

See also
Rally raid

References

External links
  official website
 Reports about the Series

 
Cross Country Rally World Cup
Cross Country Rally World Cup
Recurring sporting events established in 2021